The 2020 Internazionali Femminili di Palermo was a professional women's tennis tournament played on outdoor clay courts at the Country Time Club. It was the 28th edition of the tournament which was part of the 2020 WTA Tour. It took place in Palermo, Italy between 3 and 9 August 2020. This was the first tournament of the 2020 WTA Tour after the suspension due to COVID-19 pandemic. This restrictions have eased to reduce a number of spectators to 350, and limited of photographers and journalists.

Points and prize money

Point distribution

Prize money 

*per team

Singles main draw entrants

Seeds 

 Rankings are as of March 16, 2020

Other entrants 
The following players received wildcards into the singles main draw:
  Elisabetta Cocciaretto
  Sara Errani

The following players received entry from the qualifying draw:
  Kaja Juvan 
  Liudmila Samsonova
  Aliaksandra Sasnovich 
  Nadia Podoroska

The following player received entry as a lucky loser:
  Océane Dodin

Withdrawals 
Before the tournament
  Anna Blinkova → replaced by  Camila Giorgi
  Johanna Konta → replaced by  Tamara Zidanšek
  Veronika Kudermetova → replaced by  Sorana Cîrstea
  Svetlana Kuznetsova → replaced by  Arantxa Rus
  Karolína Muchová → replaced by  Sara Sorribes Tormo
  Jeļena Ostapenko → replaced by  Patricia Maria Țig
  Anastasija Sevastova → replaced by  Kirsten Flipkens
  Iga Świątek → replaced by  Irina-Camelia Begu

Doubles main draw entrants

Seeds 

 1 Rankings are as of March 16, 2020

Other entrants 
The following pair received a wildcard into the doubles main draw:
  Federica Bilardo /  Dalila Spiteri

Finals

Singles 

  Fiona Ferro def.  Anett Kontaveit, 6–2, 7–5

Doubles 

  Arantxa Rus /  Tamara Zidanšek defeated  Elisabetta Cocciaretto /  Martina Trevisan, 7–5, 7–5

References

External links 
 Official website 

Internazionali Femminili di Palermo
Internazionali Femminili di Palermo
2020 in Italian women's sport
Internazionali Femminili di Palermo
Palermo
2020 in Italian tennis